For their anterior three-fourths the corpora cavernosa penis lie in intimate apposition with one another, but behind they diverge in the form of two tapering processes, known as the crura, which are firmly connected to the ischial rami.

Traced from behind forward, each crus begins by a blunt-pointed process in front of the tuberosity of the ischium, along the perineal surface of the conjoined (ischiopubic) ramus.

Just before it meets its fellow it presents a slight enlargement, named by Georg Ludwig Kobelt (1804–1857) the bulb of the corpus cavernosum penis.

Beyond this point the crus undergoes a constriction and merges into the corpus cavernosum proper, which retains a uniform diameter to its anterior end.

Additional images

References

Mammal male reproductive system
Human penis anatomy